Johan Ulfstjerna is a 1936 Swedish drama film directed by Gustaf Edgren and starring Gösta Ekman, Björn Berglund and Birgit Tengroth. It is based on the 1907 play Johan Ulfstjerna by Tor Hedberg, which had previously been made into a 1923 silent film of the same title. It was shot at the Råsunda Studios in Stockholm. The film's sets were designed by the art director Arne Åkermark.

Synopsis
The film takes place in Helsinki at the turn of the twentieth century when an underground resistance movement attempts to liberate Finland from the Russian Empire.

Cast
 Gösta Ekman as Johan Ulfstjerna
 Edith Erastoff as Adelaide Ulfstjerna
 Björn Berglund as Helge Ulfstjerna
 Birgit Tengroth as 	Agda
 Edvin Adolphson as 	Governor General
 Ernst Eklund as Prof. Stenback
 Carl Ström as 	Ivan Ivanovitch
 Hugo Björne as 	Koskinen
 Helge Hagerman as 	Koskinen Jr.
 Erik Berglund as Pekka, groom 
 Jullan Jonsson as 	Lina
 Carl Deurell as Agda's Father
 Allan Bohlin as 	Secretary General
 Ernst Brunman as Prison guard 
 George Fant as 	Student 
 Georg Fernqvist as 	Footman
 Peter Höglund as 	Student 
 Arne Lindblad as Governor General's secretary 
 Emil Fjellström as 	Prison guard 
 Richard Lund as 	Arresting officer 
 Henrik Schildt as 	Student 
 Emmy Albiin as 	Older woman

References

Bibliography 
 Goble, Alan. The Complete Index to Literary Sources in Film. Walter de Gruyter, 1999.

External links 
 

1936 films
1936 drama films
1930s Swedish-language films
Swedish black-and-white films
Films directed by Gustaf Edgren
Remakes of Swedish films
Films set in Helsinki
Films set in the 1890s
Films set in the 1900s
Swedish films based on plays
1930s historical drama films
Swedish historical drama films
1930s Swedish films